Samford was a hundred of Suffolk, consisting of . It was situated to the south and south west of Ipswich.

The hundred was bounded by the River Orwell to the east, Essex to the south, the River Brett (and Shelley parish) to the west, and the parish boundaries of Burstall, Hintlesham and Sproughton to the north.

Parishes

Samford Hundred consisted of the following 28 parishes:

References

Hundreds of Suffolk